Bowdon may refer to:

Places
 Bowdon, Georgia, a city in Carroll County
 Bowdon High School, in the city of Bowdon, Georgia
 Bowdon Railway, which formerly connected Bowdon and Bowdon Junction
 Bowdon Junction, Georgia, an unincorporated community in Carroll County
 Bowdon, North Dakota, a city in Wells County
 Bowdon, Greater Manchester
 Bowdon Cricket Club, Greater Manchester
 Bowdon Hockey Club, Greater Manchester
 Bowdon railway station, Greater Manchester
 Bowdon Urban District, a former administrative area in Cheshire
 Bowdon (ward), an electoral district in Greater Manchester

People
 Bob Bowdon (born before 1998), American broadcast journalist and executive
 Dorris Bowdon (1914-2005), American actress
 Franklin Welsh Bowdon (1817-1857), U.S. Representative from Alabama
 Tom Butler-Bowdon (born 1967), Australian motivational writer based in England
 W. George Bowdon Jr. (1921-2005), U.S. politician in Louisiana

See also
 Bowden (disambiguation)